Griffin Alexander Stedman Jr. (January 6, 1838 – August 6, 1864) was a Colonel in the Union Army during the American Civil War and served in several key battles during the war.  He was killed in action during the Battle of Petersburg and brevetted brigadier general.

Early life and education
Stedman was born in Hartford, Connecticut on January 6, 1838 to Griffin Alexander and Mary (Shields) Stedman.  He graduated from Hartford High School and from Trinity College in Hartford, Connecticut in 1859.  After graduation, he practiced law in Philadelphia.

Civil War
When the Civil War began he joined the Washington Greys in Philadelphia.  He returned to Hartford and joined the First Regiment Colt's Revolving Rifles formed by gunmaker Samuel Colt.  The First Regiment reformed and became the 5th Connecticut Infantry Regiment with Stedman commissioned as captain of company I.  Stedman and the 5th Regiment were mustered into service on July 22, 1861.  On November 27, 1861 he was commissioned major in the 11th Connecticut Infantry Regiment.

On June 11, 1862 he was promoted to lieutenant colonel and returned with the regiment to the Army of the Potomac and fought in the Battle of Antietam.  At Antietam, he had command of the right wing of the regiment in the attack on the stone bridge  and was wounded in the leg.  He became Colonel on September 25, 1862 and was in command during the Battle of Fredericksburg.

In January 1864, the regiment re-enlisted and on its return to the front was assigned to the Eighteenth Corps.  On May 9, his troops were engaged at the Battle of Swift Creek and on May 16 at the Battle of Drewery's Bluff where he lost almost 200 men.  In late May, he commanded the brigade and fought at Cold Harbor.

He was mortally wounded by a bullet in his side during the Battle of Petersburg on August 5, 1864 and died on August 6, 1864.  Major General Edward Ord attempted to have Stedman promoted to brevet brigadier general before his death but instead it was awarded posthumously.

He was originally interred in Cedar Grove Cemetery in New London, Connecticut and was re-interred in the family plot in Cedar Hill Cemetery in Hartford, Connecticut on May 20, 1875. The sarcophagus is carved with his ornamental sword, cap and belt, inscribed with the battles he fought in and the words "Brave, just, generous and pure, without fear and reproach".

Legacy

Fort Stedman in Petersburg, Virginia was named in his honor.

A bronze statue in his likeness in the Barry Square neighborhood of Hartford, Connecticut was designed by Frederick Moynihan and cast at the Gorham Manufacturing Company.  The neighborhood was the former location of Camp-Field, which was the location of muster for Hartford troops training for the Civil War.  After the war, the 22nd and 25th Regiments established the Camp-Field Monument Association with the intent to erect a monument to dedicate the site.  The association wanted to depict a typical Connecticut volunteer with a military history associated with the site.  The association selected Stedman as the subject of the statue.

Stedman Street in Hartford is named after him and the General Griffin A. Stedman Jr. Memorial Scholarship at Trinity was instituted in his honor.

References

1838 births
1864 deaths
Burials at Cedar Grove Cemetery (New London, Connecticut)
Burials at Cedar Hill Cemetery (Hartford, Connecticut)
Military personnel from Hartford, Connecticut
Pennsylvania lawyers
People of Connecticut in the American Civil War
Trinity College (Connecticut) alumni
Union Army colonels
19th-century American lawyers
Union military personnel killed in the American Civil War